Andrew Dorman (born 1 May 1982) is a former professional footballer. During his club career, he played for New England Revolution, Crystal Palace and St. Mirren. Born in England, represented the Wales national team.

Born in England of English parents, he grew up in Wales and represented the Wales schools team, eventually gaining full senior international recognition when FIFA amended its rules on eligibility. He has played professionally in the United States, Scotland, and England.

College
Dorman moved to the United States to attend Boston University, where he was a standout for the school's college soccer team.

Club career

New England
After graduating, Dorman was drafted 58th overall in the 2004 MLS SuperDraft by the New England Revolution, and succeeded in making the team's 2004 developmental roster. Dorman made his debut for New England, coming on for Daouda Kanté in a late minutes, in a 3–1 loss against San Jose Earthquakes on 17 April 2004. In his first season with the Revs, Dorman clocked only 365 minutes, but scored two goals and an assist in that time, evincing an attacking flair.

The 2006 season was a break-out year for Dorman, as he played in all 32 games for the Revs, scoring 6 goals and assisting on 10 others. During a season when many Revolution players missed time due to injury, suspension, or international duty, Dorman was forced to play many roles and positions. His diligence and creativity on the attack gained the attention and respect of many around the league, and he was named the 2006 "Man of the Year" by the Midnight Riders, the Revolution's independent supporters group.

Although Dorman wanted to re-sign with New England in MLS, contract negotiations fell through.

St Mirren
Dorman signed with Scottish Premier League outfit St Mirren. Upon joining St Mirren, teammate Jay Heaps said Dorman was 'world class'. One year on, Dorman revealed upon signing for St Mirren, he did not know the location of the club (Paisley). He made his debut during a home league match against Motherwell on 19 January 2008, and provided an early assist in a 3–1 victory. Dorman then scored a winning goal in a Scottish Cup replay against Dundee United and he also scored against them in a 1–1 draw one month later.

His performances for St Mirren during 2008–09 led to many teams watching Dorman with a view to bringing him into their side. Teams known to be interested included Sheffield United and Bolton Wanderers. Dorman's contract with St Mirren included a club option of an extra year, which was exercised in March 2009 after he was voted Scottish Premier League player of the month for February 2009 and another player of the month for April 2009. Dorman spoke out about his transfer speculation, stating that he doesn't pay attention to the rumours and insists he's happy at St Mirren, while manager Gus MacPherson said he would only let Dorman leave for £1 million. Dorman finished the season as St Mirren's joint top scorer (with Billy Mehmet) with 12 goals each.

However, the following season, Dorman couldn't re-produce his form of the previous campaign and was unable to rediscover his goalscoring form; but still, other clubs were tracking him; like Championship side Watford. Shortly after the transfer headlines, Dorman suffered a hamstring injury, ruling him out for six weeks after coming off in the first half in a 3–1 loss against Celtic. In the next meeting against Celtic on 24 March 2010, Dorman scored a brace in a 4–0 win. After the match, MacPherson praised the players, including Dorman, himself. In mid April, Dorman scored three goals in the three games, including against Falkirk, St Johnstone and Kilmarnock. Dorman finished the season as St Mirren's league top scorer, with Billy Mehmet with 12 goals each in all appearances. At the end of the season, Dorman announced his intention to leave St Mirren, ending a two-year association with the club, with Championship side Portsmouth keen to sign him.

Crystal Palace 
After his contract at St Mirren expired, Dorman made the move to England to join Championship side Crystal Palace. On the opening day of the season, Dorman made his debut in a 3–2 win over Leicester City; two-months later, Dorman scored his first goal in a 4–3 loss against Preston. However, he made a slow start to life with the Eagles and soon dropped out of the Palace first-team after the sacking of George Burley, although Burley's successor Dougie Freedman said out of favour players Dorman and Owen Garvan did have a future.

On 31 August 2012, Dorman's contract was terminated by mutual consent, despite it being expected to end the next season.

Loan at Bristol Rovers 
His second season in south London saw him limited to appearances for Palace's reserve team, and so Dorman made the move to League Two side Bristol Rovers on a loan deal in November 2011. He made his debut for Rovers on 12 November in the FA Cup 3–1 win against Corby Town; Seven days later, Dorman made his league debut for the club in a 2–0 loss against Barnet. Dorman had initially signed until 2 January, which was extended by a further month. On 27 January 2012, he signed for the rest of the season, along with four other players. On 25 February 2012, Dorman scored his first goal in a 1–0 win over Rotherham United After scoring his first goal, Dorman spoke out about his frustration at wanting to get playing time after having his career revived at Bristol Rovers. Dorman also said he had experienced playing under three different managers during his loan spell, but saw the positive side of this. Towards the end of the season, Dorman scored his second goal in a 5–1 win over Accrington Stanley. After his loan spell at Bristol Rovers, Dorman did not rule out returning to the club after clarifying his future with Crystal Palace.

Return to New England
Dorman re-signed with New England Revolution on 15 November 2012.

Career statistics
(correct as of 5 May 2012)

International career

Although he was born in England of English parents, Dorman grew up in Wales, and represented the Welsh schools team. He expressed interest in either playing for England, Wales or gaining American citizenship and playing for the United States, having lived there for over seven years. Dorman had moved to America to attend Boston University, where he was named a two-time All-New England player.

Although Dorman considers himself to be Welsh, he was not eligible to play for Wales as he was born in England and none of his parents or grandparents were born in Wales. In October 2009, however, FIFA ratified changes which allow players with 5 years compulsory education in a country before the age of 16 to represent that country, which made Dorman eligible to represent Wales. Dorman was included in the squad to play against Scotland on 14 November 2009 when, ironically, he was playing his club football for Scottish team St Mirren. Wales won 3–0, but he stayed on the bench for the whole game. Dorman made his debut for the Wales national football team on 23 May 2010 against Croatia at the Stadion Gradski.

Personal life
Dorman has said his idol is Michael Owen. He attended Hawarden High School where Owen and the late Gary Speed also attended.

His brother is fellow player Richie Dorman.

Dorman holds a US green card which qualifies him as a domestic player for MLS roster purposes.

Honours

New England Revolution
U.S. Open Cup (1): 2007
Supporter's Player of the Year: 2006

St Mirren
Scottish League Cup runner-up: 2009–10
Renfrewshire Cup (2): 2008–09, 2009–10
Scottish Premier League Player of the Month: March 2009

References

External links 

1982 births
Living people
Sportspeople from Chester
Association football midfielders
Welsh footballers
English footballers
Wales international footballers
Boston University alumni
Boston University Terriers men's soccer players
New England Revolution players
St Mirren F.C. players
Crystal Palace F.C. players
Bristol Rovers F.C. players
FC Boston players
Major League Soccer players
Scottish Premier League players
English Football League players
USL League Two players
Welsh expatriate footballers
Welsh expatriate sportspeople in the United States
Expatriate soccer players in the United States
New England Revolution draft picks
English expatriate sportspeople in the United States
English expatriate footballers